Racheal Nachula (born 14 January 1986) is a Zambian footballer and former sprinter who plays as a forward for Spanish Primera Federación club Zaragoza CFF and the Zambia women's national team.

Athletics
Specialized in the 400 metres, Nachula won the bronze medal at the 2008 African Championships, in a personal best time of 51.39 seconds. She competed at the 2006 Commonwealth Games, the 2006 World Junior Championships, the 2008 World Indoor Championships, and the 2008 Summer Olympics without qualifying for the final round. She won the silver medal in the 400 m at the 2009 African Junior Athletics Championships, recording a time of 53.34 seconds.

She also has 23.42 seconds in the 200 metres, achieved in May 2007 in Gaborone.

Football

International goals

References

External links
Racheal Nachula at BDFútbol

1986 births
Living people
Sportspeople from Lusaka
Zambian women's footballers
Women's association football forwards
Green Buffaloes F.C. players
Zaragoza CFF players
Segunda Federación (women) players
Zambia women's international footballers
Zambian expatriate footballers
Zambian expatriates in Spain
Expatriate women's footballers in Spain
Zambian female sprinters
Athletes (track and field) at the 2006 Commonwealth Games
Athletes (track and field) at the 2008 Summer Olympics
Athletes (track and field) at the 2010 Commonwealth Games
Commonwealth Games competitors for Zambia
Olympic athletes of Zambia
Twin sportspeople
Zambian twins